Fareast Islami Life Insurance Limited , was founded in Bangladesh as a public life insurance company in 2000. Currently the company has 23 Divisional Offices, 103 Service Center Offices, 252 Zonal Offices and 635 Premium collection centers throughout Bangladesh. Sheikh Kabir Hossain is the chairman of the company.

History

Fareast Islami Life Insurance Company Limited was established on 29 May 2000. It then listed with the Dhaka Stock Exchange and Chittagong Stock Exchange.

MA Khaleque, director of Fareast Islami Life Insurance Company Limited, was appointed chairman of Fareast Finance and Investment Limited on 18 September 2007.

Md Nazrul Islam was appointed chairman of the Fareast Islami Life Insurance Company Limited in February 2010. Islam was a founding director of the insurance company and managing director of Surmi Cold Storage Limited.

The Bangladesh Securities and Exchange Commission has removed the board of directors of Fareast Islamic Life Insurance and appointed 10 new independent directors on 1 September 2021 to protect investors, policyholders and the overall capital market. Insurance Development and Regulatory Authority removed the chief executive officer of Fareast Islami Life Insurance Company Limited, Md Hemayet Ullah, after its investigation had found evidence of financial irregularities. It also banned him from joining any insurance company. According to an audit report by A Wahab & Co. Chartered Accountants, commissioned by Bangladesh Securities and Exchange Commission, 21 billion taka was stolen from Fareast Islami Life Insurance Company Limited from 2010 to 2020. The company bought land from the father-in-law and brother-in-law of its chairman, Md Nazrul Islam, for 1.72 billion taka. Land they had bought that year for 196 million taka. Money was invested in 2016 in two cooperative organizations founded by the insurance company which soon disappeared.

On 22 February 2022, Bangladesh Securities and Exchange Commission reformed the board again and appointed Sheikh Kabir Hossain chairman of the board. Beximco Group had taken control of Fareast Islami Life Insurance Company Limited. The insurance company decided to sell assets to pay insurance claims. Its former chairman Nazrul Islam, former directors MA Khaleque and Rubayat Khaled were sent to jail on charges of embezzling from the company. It shares declined in the Dhaka Stock Exchange. Sheikh Kabir Hossain claimed the company paid to taxes from 2014 to 2021 to the National Board of Revenue.

Financial performance
As on 31 December 2017 the authorized capital of the company is taka 1000 million and paid up capital is taka 747.42 million.

Insurance services
 Ekok Bima
 Sarbojonon Bima
 Group Bima

Board of directors

Subsidiaries
 Fareast Islami Securities Limited
 Fareast Islami Properties Limited

Notes

Financial services companies established in 2000
Insurance companies of Bangladesh
2000 establishments in Bangladesh